The knockout stage of the 2002–03 UEFA Champions League ran from 8 April 2003 until the final at the Old Trafford in Manchester, England on 28 May 2003. The knockout stage involved the eight teams who finished in the top two in each of their groups in the second group stage.

Each tie in the knockout stage, apart from the final, was played over two legs, with each team playing one leg at home. The team that has the higher aggregate score over the two legs will progress to the next round. In the event that aggregate scores finish level, the team that scored more goals away from home over the two legs will progress. If away goals are also equal, 30 minutes of extra time are played. If there are goals scored during extra time and the aggregate score is still level, the visiting team qualifies by virtue of more away goals scored. If no goals are scored during extra time, there will be a penalty shoot-out after extra time.

In the draw for the quarter-finals, matches are played between the winner of one group and the runner-up of a different group.

In the final, the tie is played over just one leg at a neutral venue. If scores are level at the end of normal time in the final, extra time is played, followed by penalties if scores remain tied.

Times are CEST (UTC+2) as listed by UEFA (local times are in parentheses).

Bracket

Quarter-finals

|}

First leg

Second leg

Juventus won 3–2 on aggregate.

2–2 on aggregate. Internazionale won on away goals.

Milan won 3–2 on aggregate.

Real Madrid won 6–5 on aggregate.

Semi-finals

|}

*Both Milanese sides play in the same stadium (the San Siro), but Milan were the designated away side in the second leg, and so won on "away" goals.

First leg

Second leg

Internazionale 1–1 Milan on aggregate. Milan won on away goals.

Juventus won 4–3 on aggregate.

Final

Knockout Stage
2002-03